is a Japanese professional ice hockey forward who is currently a free agent.

Suzuki has played for the Tohoku Free Blades between 2009 and 2014. He previously played for the Oji Eagles for three seasons. He has also played for the senior Japan national team.

External links
 Masahito Suzuki profile at Elite Prospects
 Free Blades player profile

1983 births
People from Tomakomai, Hokkaido
Japanese ice hockey forwards
Living people
HL Anyang players
China Dragon players
Oji Eagles players
Tohoku Free Blades players
Sportspeople from Hokkaido
Asian Games silver medalists for Japan
Medalists at the 2011 Asian Winter Games
Asian Games medalists in ice hockey
Ice hockey players at the 2011 Asian Winter Games